Payala or Piyala Lake Ghazi Ghat (Urdu  پیالہ جھیل غازی گھاٹ) is an artificial lake situated near Ghazi Ghat on Indus River near Dera Ghazi Khan District, Punjab, Pakistan. It is being developed for tourism purposes in Southern Punjab. Due to its bowl shape and deep water body, known as Pyala means bowl in Urdu language.

See also
Fort Munro
Pyala Lake, Kaghan Valley

References

Marine parks of Pakistan